Vredenburgh may refer to:

People
Dorothy Vredenburgh Bush (1916-1991), American political activist
John Vredenburgh Van Pelt (1874–1962), American architect, historian and writer
Peter Vredenburgh Jr. (1837–1864), lawyer and Union Army officer in the American Civil War
Peter Vredenburgh (judge) (1805–1873), associate justice of the New Jersey Supreme Court
Peter Vredenburgh (politician) (1836–1915), member of the Wisconsin State Assembly
William H. Vredenburgh (1840–1920), Judge of the New Jersey Court of Errors and Appeals

Places
Vredenburgh, Alabama, town in the United States
Fort Vredenburgh, fort on the Dutch Gold Coast, Ghana

See also
Vredenburg (disambiguation)
Peter Vredenburgh (disambiguation)